Uffholtz is a commune in the Haut-Rhin department in Grand Est in north-eastern France. The organist and composer Aloÿs Claussmann (1850–1926) was born in Uffholtz.

Population

See also
 Communes of the Haut-Rhin department

References

External links

 Unofficial site

Communes of Haut-Rhin